Martin Mullen (August 22, 1852 – October 27, 1915) was an American professional baseball player for the Cleveland Forest Citys. He played in one game on August 17, 1872 and was hitless in four at-bats, scoring one run. He played in right field for the game. His one appearance in the professional leagues was due to an accident. Rynie Wolters, the regular outfielder for the Forest Citys, swallowed his chaw of tobacco and could not play so Mullen, a local amateur player made his professional debut.

External links

1852 births
1915 deaths
19th-century baseball players
Major League Baseball right fielders
Cleveland Forest Citys players
Baseball players from Cleveland